Lake Palomas is a former lake in New Mexico, United States, and Chihuahua, Mexico. This lake was relatively large and reached a size of about  during its highstands. Preceded by Lake Cabeza de Vaca, it formed during the Pleistocene and continued into the Holocene, when several different lake phases occurred. Presently its basin is a major source of airborne dust in the region.

Name 

Lake Palomas is named after Puerto Palomas, Chihuahua. The northwestern part of the Lake Palomas basin is also known as "Guzmán Sink".

Hydrogeography 

At these sizes it was one of the largest pluvial lakes in the southwestern United States during the late Pleistocene. Most of the lake was located in Mexico, with only a bay between the West Potrillo Mountains and the Tres Hermanas Mountains extending into New Mexico.

At highstand, Lake Palomas contained the islands Unión and Santa María. Islands were formed by the Carrizal Mountains, the Guzmán Mountains and the Las Muertos Mountains.

The lake was subdivided into three basins (east, central and west) by upthrust Cretaceous mountains and Tertiary intrusives. None of these basins were very deep during the history of Lake Palomas; the deepest point during La Mota time was in Salinas de Unión where the current basin floor is  beneath the La Mota shoreline.

Lake Palomas has left over sediments ranging from gravel and sand at its shores and clay and silt in the centres of the basins that formed the lake.

Hydrology

Inflow 

The Río Casas Grandes, Río del Carmen, Mimbres River or Río Santa María either drained into Lake Palomas or had part of their course submerged by it. Part of the water entering into Lake Palomas seeped into the ground, nourishing aquifers in the Paso del Norte region.

Shorelines 

Three different shorelines of Lake Palomas are known. On the western side conversely, they are buried beneath alluvial deposits and thus difficult to recognize.

Lower shorelines are also found, though they are less well developed. These include the  El Sancho, the  Santa Maria shoreline and a mid-Holocene  shoreline.

Shoreline features include beach ridges, spits and wavecut platforms. After the shrinkage of Lake Palomas and its successor lakes, wind erosion has occurred on the shoreline deposits. The eroded particles formed the Samalayuca Dune Fields upon deposition.

Climate 

The present-day climate of the Lake Palomas area is cold in winter and hot in summer. Precipitation falls mostly in summer; the winter precipitation is controlled by the El Nino-Southern Oscillation.

Lake levels at Lake Palomas were controlled by the position of the polar jet stream, which could drive storm systems into the region when it was positioned farther south. The increased cloud cover and lower temperatures reduced evaporation and the storms added precipitation to the basin, causing lake levels to increase. The North American Monsoon on the other hand does not appear to have played a major role in the lake history, seeing as lake levels of Lake Palomas are correlated to lake levels in basins such as Silver Lake that are not monsoonally influenced.

Biology 

Lake Palomas contained populations of bivalves and gastropods. Among the genera found in its deposits are Physa, Planorbella, Pyganodon and Succinea.

The large size of Lake Palomas and its subsequent fragmentation had strong effects on the development of animal species inhabiting its basin, forming isolated clades. The beautiful shiner, largemouth shiner and red shiner exist within the catchment of Lake Palomas and may have developed from a common ancestor that lived in the lake and its catchment. The fragmentation of Lake Palomas would have triggered the split into various species.

History 

Before Lake Palomas, an even larger lake existed in the area, Lake Cabeza de Vaca. It was nourished by the Rio Grande through the Mesilla Valley and its shores approximately followed the present-day  contours. Lake Palomas itself is considered to have formed 500,000 years ago.

The La Mota shoreline of Lake Palomas is approximately coeval with Lake Lahontan and Lake Bonneville, about 60,000 years before present. Previously obtained radiocarbon dates on the La Mota shoreline indicate ages of 27,150 ± 1,060 and 25,200 BC, which is young for such a high shoreline. Another highstand occurred beginning 21,000 years ago between 12,000 and 15,000 years ago.

Other lakes in the region also show a highstand at that time, which at Lake Palomas is dated to 9,255 to 9,430 years ago.

Additional lake stands are recorded during the mid-Holocene, the Neoglacial and the Little Ice Age. These are dated to be 7,585 – 6,980, 4,795 – 4,220 and 495 – 230 years old before present, respectively.  The reformation of the lake during these times was probably aided by its large catchment, seeing as other regional pluvial lakes do not frequently show lake stands at these timepoints. These lake stands are correlated with Bond events and glacier advances in New Mexico. The mid-Holocene stand is unusual as other evidence indicates a dry time period.

Present day 

The Bolsón de Los Muertos is the largest present-day basin in the area of Lake Palomas. Other basins such as Guzmán playa, Indian Basin, Patos Playa, Sabinal Playa (also known as Laguna El Fresnal) and Santa María Playa presently cover the floor of Lake Palomas. During El Niño events these basins can flood, forming ephemeral lakes that last for weeks. During 2006, a hundred-year flood filled many of these basins until the following year.

The lake bed of Lake Palomas is a major source of airborne dust pollution in the Western Hemisphere, reaching as far as Canada. This dust is swept up by dry season storms and can heavily pollute El Paso and Ciudad Juárez. Other former lakebeds in the region also generate dust. The formation of this dust is facilitated by the texture of the clay and silt deposits, which are easily eroded by the wind in the flat land of the playas. Hazardous elements such as arsenic and lead are found in this dust.

References

Sources 

 
 
 
 

Palomas
Natural history of New Mexico
Lakes of New Mexico
Natural history of Chihuahua (state)
Landforms of Chihuahua (state)